Kaljawade is a village in the Kolhapur district of Maharashtra, India.

Geography
Kaljawade is located at the boundary of the towns of Shahuwadi and Gaganbawada, near the Kaljawade Jambhali River.

Demographics
Kaljawade total population is 1171 with 585 male and 586 female.

Kaljawade Panchayat code number 180709

References

Villages in Kolhapur district